Maanikkam Yogeswaran (A.K.A. Yoga) is a Sri Lankan Tamil musician and exponent of Carnatic music. He was born 1959 in Meesalai, Sri Lanka, where he attended Jaffna Hindu College before moving to London.

As a classical singer in the South Indian (Carnatic) tradition, he trained under S. Balasingam and P. Muthukkumaraswamy. He has contributed to film scores and dance and theatre companies in and outside the United Kingdom.

Besides being a member of the London-based band The Shout, he has performed with the German world music band Dissidenten.

As part of the AIUME educational project, he has brought Indian music to new audiences. The 2008 world conference of ISME in Bologna familiarized educators from different cultures with his approach.

He has sung on the soundtrack to Stanley Kubrick's film Eyes Wide Shut in a piece composed by Jocelyn Pook, thus becoming the first Tamil singer whose work has been featured in a Hollywood movie. He was featured throughout the Spike Lee's film 25th Hour, and has recorded the Tamil Thirukkural in 133 different ragas.

Yoga dedicated his 2005 album Peace for Paradise to human rights, peace and reconciliation in Sri Lanka.

References

 The Oxford Illustrated Companion to South Indian Classical Music. p. 70. .

External links
 Official Website

Living people
Sri Lankan Tamil musicians
1959 births
Alumni of Jaffna Hindu College